Superior may refer to:

Superior (hierarchy), something which is higher in a hierarchical structure of any kind

Places
Superior (proposed U.S. state), an unsuccessful proposal for the Upper Peninsula of Michigan to form a separate state
Lake Superior, the largest of the North American Great Lakes, Canada, United States

United Kingdom
 Rickinghall Superior, England

United States
Superior, Arizona
Superior, Colorado
Superior, Indiana
Superior, Iowa
Superior Township, Chippewa County, Michigan
Superior Township, Washtenaw County, Michigan
Superior, Montana
Superior, Nebraska
Superior, West Virginia
Superior, Wisconsin, a city
Superior (town), Wisconsin, a town adjacent to the city
Superior (village), Wisconsin, a village adjacent to the city
Superior, Wyoming
Superior (RTA Rapid Transit station), a station on the RTA Red Line in Cleveland, Ohio
Superior Bay, a bay between Minnesota and Wisconsin
Superior Falls, a waterfall between Michigan and Wisconsin

Religious titles
An abbot or prior
Superior general, a supervisory role in a religious order or congregation
Provincial superior, a supervisory role in a religious order or congregations

Entertainment
Superior (band), a progressive metal band from Germany
"Superior", a song by SpongeBob & The Hi-Seas from The Best Day Ever
Superior (album), a 2008 album by Tim Christensen
Superior (manga), a 2009 Manga created by Ichtys
Superior (comics), a creator-owned comic book series written by Mark Millar and illustrated by Leinil Francis Yu
Superior (film), a 2021 drama film by Erin Vassilopoulos

Business
Standard Superior, a German automobile brand built in the 1920s
Superior (bus manufacturer), an Australian manufacturer of buses
Superior Coach Company, a former manufacturer of school buses and that currently builds hearses
Superior Helicopter, a heavy lift helicopter operator of Glendale, Oregon
Superior Industries, a conveyor manufacturer based in Morris, Minnesota
Superior Oil Company, defunct American oil company, now part of ExxonMobil
Superior Software, a video game publisher
Superior Airways, a chartered air service based in Red Lake, Ontario, Canada

Other uses
Superior: The Return of Race Science, a book (2019) by Angela Saini
Roman Catholic Diocese of Superior, Wisconsin
Superior multimineral process, a shale oil extraction technology developed by Superior Oil Company
Superior as an anatomical term of location
Superior as a description of the relative position of a flower's ovary
Superior (schooner), an 1816 schooner that operated on the Great Lakes
Superior (potato), a mid-season potato variety
Neil Superior (born 1963), American professional wrestler

Superiority
Superiority may refer to:

Air superiority, the dominance of one military's airborne forces over another in any given conflict
Superiority complex, psychological condition
"Superiority" (short story), a 1951 book by Arthur C. Clarke

See also

Mother Superior (disambiguation)
 Superior Aviation (disambiguation)
Superior Bank (disambiguation)
Superior High School (disambiguation)
 Superior Lake (disambiguation)
Superior Township (disambiguation)
 Superia (disambiguation)
Superior Township (disambiguation)

Stereotypes